Evan Trupp (born October 22, 1987) is an American professional ice hockey player currently plays with the Dresdner Eislöwen of the DEL2.

Playing career
Trupp played two seasons of junior hockey for the Penticton Vees of the British Columbia Hockey League (BCHL) scoring a total of 129 points in 94 regular season games.  Trupp was named BCHL (Interior Conference) Rookie of the Year in 2005–06.

Trupp then attended the University of North Dakota where he played four seasons (2007–2011) of NCAA hockey for North Dakota, scoring 40 goals and 68 assists for 108 points, while registering 90 penalty minutes in 157 games played. Trupp was part of the North Dakota team that won the 2010 WCHA Men's Ice Hockey Tournament for which he was named Tournament MVP and the 2011 WCHA Men's Ice Hockey Tournament.

Trupp started the 2011–12 season in the ECHL with the Cincinnati Cyclones, but on January 12, 2012 he was traded to the Bakersfield Condors.

On March 8, 2013, the 2012–13 ECHL trading deadline, the Condors moved Trupp to the Alaska Aces in exchange for Shawn Skelly and Chris Haltigin. The Aces announced on September 5, 2013 that they had re-signed Trupp for the 2013–14 season. Later in the season he made his AHL debut with affiliate, the Abbotsford Heat. After 17 games with the Heat, Trupp returned to the Aces to help capture the Kelly Cup.

On August 28, 2014, Trupp had signed a one-year AHL contract with the Worcester Sharks, an affiliate of the San Jose Sharks. In the 2014–15 season with the Sharks, Trupp enjoyed his most successful professional season, establishing an offensive presence with 40 points in 72 games.

On July 2, 2015, Trupp signed for his third AHL club, agreeing to a one-year deal with the Chicago Wolves. Unable to replicate his previous season totals, Trupp appeared in 59 games with the Wolves for 7 goals and 22 points from the checking line in the 2015–16 season.

As a free agent in the off-season, Trupp opted to leave the AHL and signed a one-year contract with German club, Augsburger Panther of the DEL on July 20, 2016. Following his second season with Augsburger in 2017–18 season, Trupp left as a free agent but continued in the DEL by signing a one-year deal with Iserlohn Roosters on April 6, 2018.

After three seasons in the DEL, Trupp left to sign a contract in the neighbouring EBEL agreeing to a one-year contract with the  Dornbirn Bulldogs on June 19, 2019. In November 2020 he signs a contract with the German second tier hockey team Dresdner Eislöwen.

Career statistics

Awards and achievements
 2005–06 BCHL (Interior conference) Rookie of the Year
 2009–10 NCAA (WCHA) Tournament Champion
 2009–10 NCAA (WCHA) Tournament MVP
 2010–11 NCAA (WCHA) Tournament Champion
 2012–13 ECHL Brabham Cup (Regular season champion)

References

External links

1987 births
Living people
Abbotsford Heat players
Alaska Aces (ECHL) players
Augsburger Panther players
Bakersfield Condors (1998–2015) players
Chicago Wolves players
Cincinnati Cyclones (ECHL) players
Des Moines Buccaneers players
Dornbirn Bulldogs players
Dresdner Eislöwen players
Ice hockey people from Anchorage, Alaska
Iserlohn Roosters players
Penticton Vees players
North Dakota Fighting Hawks men's ice hockey players
University of North Dakota alumni
Worcester Sharks players
American men's ice hockey forwards